Jesse Lee Turner (born 1938) is a former American singer. He recorded songs for several labels in the late 1950s, including the one-hit wonder "Little Space Girl".

Turner was born in Addicks, Texas, United States, and graduated from high school in Boling, Texas. His first recording was the single "Teenage Misery" for Fraternity Records. In 1958, he released the single "Little Space Girl" b/w "Shake Baby Shake" on Carlton Records; the tune hit No. 20 on the Billboard Hot 100 in 1959. The follow-up "Thinkin'" failed to chart, and Turner switched to Top Rank Records to release "Do I Worry", which also sold poorly. Moving to Sudden Records, he wrote and issued "The Elopers" to no success; GNP Records also released "Ballad of Billy Sol Estes" and a second single.

Turner's output comprises 15 known songs; most of which have been reissued on the CD, Shake, Baby, Shake.  He currently lives in Texas.

References

1938 births
Living people
American male singers
American rockabilly musicians
Singers from Texas
Imperial Records artists
Carlton Records artists
People from Houston